Radenko Kneževič (born 24 January 1979) is a former Slovenian footballer who played as a forward.

References

External links
NZS profile 

1979 births
Living people
Slovenian footballers
Slovenia under-21 international footballers
Association football forwards
NK Domžale players
FC Koper players
NK Aluminij players
Slovenian expatriate footballers
Slovenian expatriate sportspeople in Italy
Expatriate footballers in Italy
Slovenian PrvaLiga players
Slovenian Second League players
Slovenian football managers
Slovenian expatriate football managers
Expatriate football managers in Italy